Elizabeth Mathis is an American actress from Detroit. She played Pushy in Blue Crush 2 and Nicole Barnes in Unstoppable.

Early life 
Southfield, Michigan native,<ref>{{cite web|url=https://www.vibe.com/2010/12/initiation-trons-elizabeth-mathis-our-wonder-woman-2|title=Initiation: 'Trons Elizabeth Mathis Is Our Wonder Woman|accessdate=June 1, 2020|date=December 16, 2010|work=Vibe|author=}}</ref> Mathis grew up in the Detroit area where she said she formed a strong bond with her family. She has said, “I'm a definite Midwest kid. I like green grass and playing outside and all of that. My upbringing was very down home.” Mathis briefly participated in beauty pageants, winning Miss Teen Michigan in 1998, though she did not place in the follow up national pageant. Mathis then studied communications and business at Northwestern University. While there, she embraced acting and explored her talent off-campus. She later pursued her passion and moved to New York.

 Career 
After a number of years in background roles ('Irresistible Fantasy Woman #2', 'Hot Girl 2'), with minor roles in two feature films (Tess in 2007’s Enchanted and Nicole in 2010’s Unstoppable), Mathis had a major role in the 2011 direct-to-video film Blue Crush 2.  After Blue Crush 2, Mathis appeared in only three more, direct-to-video, releases; two in 2012 and one in 2015.

Mathis went through tough training for her role as Pushy in Blue Crush 2, including learning how to surf, despite having an on-screen surf-double. Mathis worked with her dialect coach for two hours every day in preparation for her role as a native South African. She also took dance lessons and yoga to maintain her already athletic build. “I really want to tap into diverse characters," she said. "I want to push the limits of myself. And most of all I just want to have fun.”''

Filmography

Television

Films

References

External links
 

Living people
American film actresses
American television actresses
Northwestern University alumni
Actresses from Detroit
21st-century American actresses
Year of birth missing (living people)